Miran Ravter (born 14 February 1972 in Velenje) is a Slovenian former alpine skier who competed in the 1994 Winter Olympics.

External links
 sports-reference.com

1972 births
Living people
Slovenian male alpine skiers
Olympic alpine skiers of Slovenia
Alpine skiers at the 1994 Winter Olympics
People from Velenje
20th-century Slovenian people